Jigsaw (William "Billy" Russo, also known as "The Beaut" before his disfigurement) is a fictional character appearing in American comic books published by Marvel Comics. Created by writer Len Wein and artist Ross Andru, the character made his first full appearance in The Amazing Spider-Man #162 (November 1976). He is depicted as an enemy of the Punisher and Spider-Man as well as a recurring foe of Daredevil.

The character was portrayed by Dominic West in the film Punisher: War Zone and Ben Barnes in the Marvel Cinematic Universe / Netflix series The Punisher.

Publication history
Jigsaw was created by writer Len Wein and artist Ross Andru. He first appeared in The Amazing Spider-Man #162 (November 1976). He returned in The Amazing Spider-Man #188, and The Punisher #1 and #4–5. Jigsaw then allied with the Rev in The Punisher Vol. 2, #35–40, and Gregario in #55–56. Following a cameo appearance in The Punisher War Journal #61, Jigsaw's origin was detailed in Issues #3–4 of the prequel limited series The Punisher: Year One, and he further bedeviled the Punisher in Punisher Vol. 3, #2–4 and #9–10.

Preceding an encounter with the eponymous character in Daredevil Vol. 2, #61–64, Jigsaw appeared in The New Avengers #1–3, #35, #46, #50, #57, and The New Avengers Annual #2; concurrent to his appearances in that title, Jigsaw also starred in Punisher War Journal Vol. 2, #11, #18–20, and #22–23. He was then featured in the five-issue miniseries Punisher: In the Blood, and made a subsequent cameo in the Thunderbolts Vol. 2 Annual.

Jigsaw received profiles in The Official Handbook of the Marvel Universe #6, The Official Handbook of the Marvel Universe Master Edition #10, Marvel Encyclopedia #4 and #5, The New Avengers Most Wanted Files #1, and Official Handbook of the Marvel Universe A–Z #6.

Fictional character biography
Billy Russo was born to a poor Italian-American family, kicked out and abandoned as an orphan by his abusive father at the age of ten, and went on to become a hitman for New York's Italian criminal underworld, where his good looks garnered him the nickname "Billy the Beaut". He married a woman named Susan, and would beat both her and their son, Henry, once forcing Henry to drown his pet cat's kittens by threatening to shoot Susan. After the botched gangland execution that inadvertently led to the Castle family being massacred, Russo is hired by Frank Costa to cover up their deaths by killing all of their friends and loved ones. Russo kills all of his targets except for Frank Castle, who survives a bomb planted by Russo. Hours later, Frank, now the vigilante Punisher, tracks Russo down to a Maggia nightclub. He guns down all of Russo's men, but leaves him alive to send a message to organized crime after knocking him through a glass window pane, an act that reduces Russo's face to a jigsaw puzzle-like mess of scars.

Taking advantage of his hideous visage, Russo adopts the identity of "Jigsaw", and attempts to frame the Punisher for murder. However, the plan fails due to the intervention of Spider-Man and Nightcrawler; Spider-Man witnesses one of Jigsaw's murders, and one of his victims is an old friend of Nightcrawler's. Jigsaw later battled Spider-Man again.

It is revealed in the first Punisher miniseries that Jigsaw was behind a plan to drug the Punisher, causing his enemy to behave erratically and attack anyone he perceived as a criminal, even for something as minor as littering. Jigsaw also attempts to kill the Punisher while he is incarcerated. The Punisher confronts and defeats him, and later stops Jigsaw from escaping under cover of a prison riot. Later in the series, Jigsaw is brainwashed by the Trust into serving as a member of a Punisher-style assassination squad. He manages to remember who he is after encountering Castle once again, and attacks the Punisher, only to be defeated once more.

Jigsaw is broken out of Ryker's Island by the Rev, who has him supervise the importation of a sterility-inducing Venezuelan drug intended for testing on the people of New York City. When the drug shipment is destroyed by the Punisher, Jigsaw sics a street gang on him, and flees to Venezuela with the Rev. After Jigsaw's face is healed by the Rev's powers, he is shot by the Punisher, but resurrected by the Rev, with the assistance of Belasco. Jigsaw's restored face is destroyed, and he is left for dead in the jungle in a later battle with the Punisher. Jigsaw recovers, and subsequently attempts to illegally reenter the United States, but is arrested and returned to Ryker's Island. When the Punisher is captured by the authorities and sent to same prison, Jigsaw tries to kill him, but the Punisher survives and escapes from Ryker's.

After the Punisher is arrested and sentenced to death for countless murders, Jigsaw dons a stylized copy of his costume and embarks on a homicidal rampage, targeting all those connected to the execution. When the Punisher is revealed to still be alive, an overjoyed Jigsaw attempts to kill him, but the Punisher overpowers him with the assistance of Daredevil. Jigsaw later partners with various syndicates to lay siege to the estate of the Geraci crime family after learning that Punisher has been forced to become their new underboss. Jigsaw and his allies abduct the Geracis, but they are saved by the Punisher, who shoots Jigsaw in the head.

Jigsaw next establishes a gunrunning operation, which is broken up by Daredevil and Black Widow. When his attempt at negotiating with Daredevil (who had declared himself the new Kingpin) fails, Jigsaw seeks revenge by breaking into Daredevil's home, where he is subdued by Black Widow. Jigsaw is remanded to the Raft, an island supervillain prison, which he escapes from (breaking Spider-Man's arm in the process) when the facility is attacked by Electro. Once free, Jigsaw tries to rob a bank, but is beaten by Tigra. This humiliation leads to his forming an alliance with the self-proclaimed "super-villain Kingpin" the Hood; together, Jigsaw and the Hood film themselves threatening and torturing Tigra. Later, Jigsaw takes part in the Hood's attack on the Sanctum Sanctorum, where he attempts to snipe Jessica Jones and Danielle Cage, only to be foiled by Spider-Man.

Jigsaw has resumed his vendetta against the Punisher, in the pages of Punisher: War Journal. Now wearing a color-inverted mockup of the Punisher costume, Jigsaw arranges for the brainwashing of a young auxiliary police officer in the NYPD. Exploiting the naive cop's pathological "hero-worship" complex, Jigsaw and his new psychiatrist girlfriend turn the young man into a new version of the Punisher.

After a battle on the Brooklyn Bridge where the Punisher once again spares Jigsaw's life, Jigsaw is taken into S.H.I.E.L.D. custody. While imprisoned he is seemingly shot dead by the man that he and his girlfriend (who was actually undercover S.H.I.E.L.D. agent Lynn Michaels) had brainwashed. Jigsaw survived the attempt on his life, and was transferred to a "reprogramming asylum" by H.A.M.M.E.R. He returns to the Hood's Gang in Secret Invasion to assist in fending off the invading Skrulls, and rejoins again in Dark Reign to help attack the New Avengers.

Jigsaw then partners with the similarly disfigured Stuart Clarke. Together, the "Jigsaw Brothers" hire Lady Gorgon to impersonate Maria Castle while they manipulate Henry, the Punisher's ally and Jigsaw's son, into helping them capture and kill the Punisher. After betraying and murdering Clarke, Jigsaw battles the Punisher on top of his own burning headquarters, only to fall through the roof of the building and into the fire below.

Jigsaw resurfaced when the pictures of he and Spider-Man were shown enjoying ice cream cones together while under the thrall of fairy king Oberoth'M'Gozz.

A recovered Jigsaw afterward appears in the Civil War II storyline as one of the criminals that the Kingpin has assembled to help him rebuild his New York empire.

During the "Search for Tony Stark" arc, Jigsaw rejoined Hood's gang and assisted in the attack on Castle Doom.

Punisher Vol. 12 
In the fallout from the Secret Empire event, Punisher is captured by Nick Fury and handed over to Baron Zemo, who's eager to exact punishment on the vigilante for targeting Hydra. Jigsaw accompanies Zemo in Bagalia, acting as one of the Baron's operatives. Zemo's plans to publicly execute Frank Castle in Bagalia go wrong and Jigsaw is dispatched to re-capture Castle. Commanding Zemo's Hydra agents, Jigsaw ultimately kills Sister Mercy, a nun Frank befriended in Bagalia's prison.

Both Zemo and Castle ultimately escape Bagalia and Jigsaw then appears in NYC, where he is presented as a disguised member of Zemo's new team of Thunderbolts. Jigsaw clashes with Thunderbolts veteran Moonstone while holed up with the rest of the team, but when the Thunderbolts do battle with Punisher's squad of allied heroes, Jigsaw intervenes to save Zemo, allowing the Thunderbolts to escape with a hostage.

Powers and abilities
Jigsaw is an athletic man with no superhuman powers. During his time in prison, he was able to hone his physical strength to a level comparable to the Punisher. He has extensive experience with street-fighting techniques, and familiarity with a variety of weapons and criminal techniques. He carries various handguns as needed. He has been known to wear a special exo-skeleton in his outfits. Before Jigsaw was disfigured, he was a highly-charismatic leader and criminal organizer, but after the accident, only the latter trait remained.

Other versions

2099

A cyborg and the under-capo of a crime syndicate called Cyber-Nostra, Multi-Fractor is the one to inform the group's leader, Fearmaster, of the existence of the new Punisher, who Multi-Fractor encounters for the first time while attempting to illegally demolish a decrepit neighborhood inhabited by "Decreds". Multi-Fractor survives his initial run-in with the Punisher, who he encounters again while extorting protection money from a Grav-Ball Stadium. When the Punisher gains the upper hand in the ensuing fight, a trio of corrupt police officers come to Multi-Fractor's aid, providing him with a power-enhancing device, which kills him when the Punisher rams the machine into Multi-Fractor's chest.

A mortician and a veterinarian resurrect Multi-Fractor as Jigsaw 2099, a Frankenstein's monster-like being made of machinery and body parts taken from animals. Jigsaw attempts to get revenge on the Punisher, but is temporarily flash frozen by the crime fighter, psychologically tortured for information, and then imprisoned in the Punisher's "Punishment Hotel". Jigsaw is located and freed by Fearmaster, and together the two try to execute the Punisher with his own Molecular Disintegrator. When the machine is turned on, its fail-safes activate, and blast Jigsaw. Jigsaw is later discovered, taken captive, and further augmented by a gang, which he massacres and escapes from before rejoining Fearmaster.

Crossovers
Jigsaw appears in both Batman/Punisher intercompany crossover books. In the first crossover, Jigsaw allies with the Joker and they both fight the Punisher and Batman (Jean Paul Valley). In the sequel, Jigsaw's face is repaired by one of the world's foremost plastic surgeons, extorted by the Joker (although the result is never seen as his face is heavily bandaged for most of the story), whom Jigsaw allies with again to take over Gotham. At the end of this crossover, Jigsaw's reconstructed face is destroyed by one of the Punisher's fragmentation grenades, and he is knocked out and left for the police by Batman (Bruce Wayne). Jigsaw and the Punisher's activities in Gotham are later recounted by both Azrael and Nightwing.

When the Amalgam Universe came into being as a result of the events of DC vs. Marvel, Jigsaw was merged with Wonder Woman foe Cheetah to form "Pelt-Man"; cursed by an ancient ritual to resemble a big cat, Billy Minerva took his anger over his condition out on beautiful people, mutilating their faces until he was located and subdued by Trevor Castle and Diana Prince.

Earth X
At some point in Earth X, Jigsaw died, and was sent to the Realm of the Dead. When Captain Marvel and Thanos destroyed Death and created Paradise, Jigsaw was among the many who came to realize that they were actually deceased. Jigsaw rejected Paradise and remained in the Realm of the Dead, where he and the Jackal took to tormenting the Punisher, who had committed suicide, and was living in blissful ignorance with his equally unaware family. Jigsaw and the Jackal's actions cause the Punisher to remember his death, and drive a wedge between him and his disbelieving loved ones, who only come to accept that they are dead much later. Captain America, who had been sent by Paradise to bring others to it, punishes Jigsaw and the Jackal by banishing them to a desolate region of the Realm of the Dead.

Marvel MAX
Jigsaw, operating under the alias The Heavy, appears in the "Girls in White Dresses" storyline of The Punisher MAX. An American drug lord, Jigsaw expands his empire to Mexico, and has his affiliates within the country kidnap women from border towns for use as disposable slave labor in meth labs. When the families of the abducted and murdered women seek aid from the Punisher, Jigsaw drives the crime fighter to suicidal despair by tricking him into believing he had accidentally shot an innocent girl, though a last minute epiphany prompts the Punisher into exhuming and performing an amateur autopsy on the child, leading to the discovery that the bullet that ended her life was not one of his own. The Punisher proceeds to destroy Jigsaw's Mexican operation and free his captives, and during a subsequent fight between the two archenemies the Punisher knocks Jigsaw out a window and onto the boxcar of a passing train, leaving his fate ambiguous.

Bullseye later researches Jigsaw and other enemies of the Punisher, such as Barracuda, Finn Cooley, and General Nikolai Zakharov.

Jigsaw's role in "Girls in White Dresses" was regarded as generic and anticlimactic, and his inclusion in the MAX imprint criticized as obtrusive and gratuitous, by Jesse Schedeen of IGN, who felt that the character was "planted in this story mainly to appeal to fans of the recent movie".

Marvel Noir
Jigsaw is Al Capone's top assassin in Punisher Noir. He, Barracuda, and the Russian are hired to kill Frank Castelione, a grocer who had defied mob boss Dutch Schultz. Years later, Frank's son, the Punisher, tries to ambush Jigsaw, but is shot unconscious, and has his skull-face mask removed. Jigsaw takes the Punisher to his lair, and tortures him by carving a skull into the Punisher's chest. After Jigsaw mentions who helped him and Barracuda murder Frank, the Punisher escapes his bonds, and kills Jigsaw by garroting.

In other media

Television

 Billy Russo appears in the live-action Marvel Cinematic Universe (MCU) / Netflix series The Punisher, portrayed by Ben Barnes. This version is Frank Castle's former best friend who served alongside him in the Marine Corps Force Reconnaissance as a Scout Sniper. After he left the Marines, Russo started his own private military contracting firm, Anvil. Coming from a traumatizing background, he is nicknamed "Billy the Beaut" by Castle due to his good looks and womanizing habits. In season one, DHS agent Dinah Madani begins interviewing Russo about Castle, leading to Russo and Madani entering a relationship. Working with his former commanding officer William Rawlins, Russo plots to eliminate Castle and anyone who could link them to their illegal affairs in Kandahar. After Russo kills Madani's partner however, she slowly catches on to Russo's criminal activities. Russo and Rawlins later capture Castle, but Russo betrays Rawlins and leaves him to die at Castle's hands before facing Castle himself. While Castle grievously disfigures Russo's face, the latter is hospitalized. In season two, Russo is left with mild facial scars and memory loss. To address both, he begins wearing a mask with a shattered visage and receiving psychiatric help from Dr. Krista Dumont, whom he later forms a connection with. While violently acting out, he re-encounters Castle. After trying and failing to frame him for the murder of several innocents, Russo attempts to flee with Dumont. However, Madani finds the couple, pushes Dumont out of a window and shoots an enraged Russo, though he survives and knocks out Madani. Russo takes refuge in Curtis Hoyle's workplace basement, but Castle finds and kills him.

Film

 Jigsaw was included in one of Michael France's early drafts of The Punisher. Thomas Jane revealed that Jigsaw was going to be the main antagonist in the sequel, which was ultimately never produced.
 Jigsaw appears in the 2008 reboot Punisher: War Zone, portrayed by Dominic West. This version is a younger crime boss named Billy "The Beaut" Russoti. While attending a mob dinner, the Punisher attacks the attending criminals. Russoti escapes to his recycling plant, but is pursued by the Punisher and falls into a glass crusher. Russoti receives help from a plastic surgeon, but the latter is unable to restore his mutilated visage due to his facial muscles, tendons, skin, and bone structure being damaged beyond repair. Rechristening himself "Jigsaw", Russoti breaks his brother James "Loony Bin Jim" Russoti out of an asylum to assist him in getting revenge on the Punisher. They kidnap the Punisher's allies and unite several New York criminal gangs under them to lure him into a trap, but the Punisher kills them all.

Video games
 Jigsaw appears as a boss in the 1990 NES game The Punisher.
 Jigsaw appears as the final boss in The Punisher: The Ultimate Payback!.
 Jigsaw appears in the 1990 computer game The Punisher.
 Jigsaw appears as a sub-boss in the 1993 arcade game The Punisher.
 A variation of Jigsaw appears in The Punisher 2004 film tie-in game, voiced by Darryl Kurylo. This version is John Saint, the son of Howard Saint, who was left facially disfigured after being attacked and left for dead by the Punisher. Taking the name Jigsaw, Saint takes over his deceased father's business and vows revenge on the Punisher.
 Jigsaw appears as a playable character in The Punisher: No Mercy.

Toys
 In 2006, a figure of Jigsaw was released as part of a two-pack in the second wave of the Marvel Legends "Face-Off" series. He was paired with the Punisher and came in two versions, one with a business suit and one with a Punisher costume. The two-pack was released in December 2006.
 In 2008, a figure of Jigsaw was released in a minimates boxset based on the film Punisher: War Zone alongside the Punisher and Loony Bin Jim.
 In 2009, Hasbro released a Jigsaw figure in its Mighty Muggs toy line.
 In 2022, Hasbro released a Walgreens exclusive Jigsaw figure in its Marvel Legends line.

References

External links
 Jigsaw at Comicvine
 Billy Russo at Marvel Wikia
 
 

Characters created by Len Wein
Characters created by Ross Andru
Comics characters introduced in 1976
Crime film characters
Fictional assassins in comics
Fictional characters with disfigurements
Fictional crime bosses
Fictional gangsters
Fictional Italian American people
Fictional murderers
Male film villains
Marvel Comics film characters
Marvel Comics male supervillains
Punisher characters